Wellesley Town Hall is located at 525 Washington Street in Wellesley, Massachusetts.  Occupying a prominent location in Hunnewell Park near the town's central business district, this Romanesque stone building was designed by Shaw & Hunnewell and built between 1881 and 1886.  Its construction was funded by, and it was built on land donated by, H. H. Hunnewell.  The east end of the building, which was finished first, was opened as the public library in 1883, whose initial collection was also funded by Hunnewell.  The building is a striking example of the then-fashionable Richardsonian Romanesque, although it also exhibits French Chateau features seen by the architects during travels in Europe.

The building was listed on the National Register of Historic Places in 1976.

See also
National Register of Historic Places listings in Norfolk County, Massachusetts

References

City and town halls on the National Register of Historic Places in Massachusetts
Wellesley, Massachusetts
Buildings and structures in Norfolk County, Massachusetts
Town halls in Massachusetts
National Register of Historic Places in Norfolk County, Massachusetts